Mattia Di Renzo (born May 16, 1994), better known by the stage name Elecktra Bionic, is an Italian drag queen based in Turin, Piedmont. They are best known for winning the first season of Drag Race Italia.

Career
They were announced as a contestant on Drag Race Italia in 2021. They won four out of a possible six mini challenges on the show, while never winning a single maxi challenge. They eventually became the first contestant in the Drag Race franchise to win their season without winning any maxi challenges. In April 2022 Elecktra revealed that they had been invited to compete on Canada's Drag Race: Canada vs. the World but declined.

Personal life
In December 2018, Di Renzo was the victim of a homophobic attack. They were harassed and punched by two French men. They, in full drag, were able to win a fist fight against both and scare them off.

Filmography

Television

Discography

As featured artist

References

1994 births
Living people
Drag Race Italia winners
Entertainers from Turin
Italian drag queens